Kyle Richard Crockett (born December 15, 1991) is an American former professional baseball pitcher. He played in Major League Baseball (MLB) for the Cleveland Indians and Cincinnati Reds. He attended the University of Virginia, where he played college baseball for the Virginia Cavaliers.

Amateur career
Crockett attended Poquoson High School in Poquoson, Virginia, and played for the school's baseball team as a teammate of Chad Pinder. In 2009 and 2010, Poquoson won consecutive AA Virginia High School League state championships. He had a 27–0 win‐loss record and was twice named Virginia's high school baseball player of the year.

Crockett enrolled at the University of Virginia, where he played college baseball for the Virginia Cavaliers baseball team in the Atlantic Coast Conference. In three years at Virginia, Crockett had a 1.97 earned run average (ERA), and served as the team's closer in his junior year. In 2012, he played collegiate summer baseball with the Orleans Firebirds of the Cape Cod Baseball League and was named a league all-star.

Professional career

Cleveland Indians
Before the 2013 Major League Baseball Draft, Baseball America rated Crockett as the 103rd best available prospect. The Cleveland Indians selected Crockett in the fourth round, with the 111th overall selection. He signed with Cleveland, forgoing his senior year at Virginia, for a $463,000 signing bonus.

Crockett began his professional career in June 2013 with the Mahoning Valley Scrappers of the Class A-Short Season New York–Penn League. After pitching  innings without allowing a run, he received a promotion to the Lake County Captains of the Class A Midwest League in July. The next month, after pitching in four games for Lake County, he was promoted to the Akron Aeros of the Class AA Eastern League. For the week ending September 3, Crockett was named the organization's minor league player of the week. Crockett pitched  innings for Akron without allowing a run. Crockett only allowed one earned run in the 2013 season.

The Indians assigned Crockett to Akron to start the 2014 season. After pitching to a 0.57 ERA in 15 appearances, they promoted him to the major leagues on May 16.  He was the first player from the 2013 Major League Baseball Draft to reach the major leagues.

Cincinnati Reds
Crockett was designated for assignment on November 20, 2017, and claimed off waivers by the Cincinnati Reds on November 27. He was non-tendered by the Reds and became a free agent on December 1. On December 4, Crockett signed a minor league contract with the Reds. He was promoted to the major leagues on June 21, 2018. He was designated for assignment on July 27, 2018. Crockett elected free agency on November 2.

Oakland Athletics
On November 26, 2018, Crockett signed a minor-league deal with the Oakland Athletics. He was released on March 19, 2019.

Arizona Diamondbacks
On December 13, 2019, Crockett signed a minor league deal with the Arizona Diamondbacks organization.

Team Texas
In July 2020, Crockett signed on to play for Team Texas of the Constellation Energy League (a makeshift 4-team independent league created as a result of the COVID-19 pandemic) for the 2020 season.

Personal life
Crockett's brother, Adam, also played for the Poquoson High School baseball team.

References

External links

Living people
1991 births
Sportspeople from Newport News, Virginia
Baseball players from Virginia
Major League Baseball pitchers
Cleveland Indians players
Cincinnati Reds players
Virginia Cavaliers baseball players
Orleans Firebirds players
Mahoning Valley Scrappers players
Lake County Captains players
Akron Aeros players
Akron RubberDucks players
Columbus Clippers players
Louisville Bats players
Team Texas players